In electrical engineering, a limit switch is a switch operated by the motion of a machine part or the presence of an object. A limit switch can be used for controlling machinery as part of a control system, as a safety interlock, or as a counter enumerating objects passing a point.

Limit switches are used in a variety of applications and environments because of their ruggedness, ease of installation, and reliability of operation. They can determine the presence, passing, positioning, and end of travel of an object. They were first used to define the limit of travel of an object, hence the name "limit switch".

Standardized limit switches are industrial control components manufactured with a variety of operator types, including lever, roller plunger, and whisker type. Limit switches may be directly mechanically operated by the motion of the operating lever. A reed switch may be used to indicate proximity of a magnet mounted on some moving part. Proximity switches operate by the disturbance of an electromagnetic field, by capacitance, or by sensing a magnetic field.

Rarely, a final operating device such as a lamp or solenoid valve is directly controlled by the contacts of an industrial limit switch, but more typically the limit switch is wired through a control relay, a motor contactor control circuit, or as an input to a programmable logic controller.

Examples

Miniature snap-action switches are components of devices like photocopiers, computer printers, convertible tops or microwave ovens to ensure internal components are in the correct position for operation and to prevent operation when access doors are opened. A set of adjustable limit switches installed on a garage door opener shut off the motor when the door has reached the fully raised or fully lowered position. A numerical control machine such as a lathe has limit switches to identify maximum limits for machine parts or to provide a known reference point for incremental motions.

References

Safety switches
Sensors